Flashback is an American radio show syndicated by Westwood One. Flashback plays a diverse mix of classic rock from the 1960s, 1970s, and 1980s. Other show elements include newscasts, classic TV and movie clips, commercials and comedy bits to create thematic segments from the 1960s into the 1990s. The four-hour program is syndicated to over 200 radio affiliates in the United States and Canada.

Flashback was originally hosted by voiceover artist Bill St. James. In early January 2012 it was announced that St. James had "stepped aside" and would be replaced by then-120 Minutes host Matt Pinfield.
St. James hosted his final edition of Flashback the weekend of January 14 & 15, 2012 and a week later on January 21 & 22, 2012, Pinfield assumed hosting duties. During the St. James tenure the show did not utilize guest hosts. In the Pinfield tenure, the year 2017 saw six shows guest hosted by San Francisco radio personality Steven Seaweed.

Two months after departing Flashback, original host Bill St. James began hosting a similar show for the United Stations Radio Networks called Time Warp. The show follows a near identical format to Flashback, presenting four hours of classic rock music mixed with other sound clips from the time period. There are a few differences in the shows. The Flashback News segment that kicks off the last hour of the show is referred to as What Happened This Week on Time Warp. Additionally, the Pinfield era of Flashback has introduced 90s music and themes whereas St. James' Time Warp has not expanded into the 90s. As of 2020, Pinfield's Flashback is still producing new material for weekly versions of the show (as of 2022, at least the second and third hours are often reruns from previous episodes), whereas St. James' Time Warp depends on archives of previously aired shows.

Flashback Pop Quiz
In addition to the original show, Benztown Radio Networks/ Cumulus Media also produce the weekly Flashback Pop Quiz, a trivia program also once hosted by St. James. Each week, questions are asked about pop culture from the 1960s to present day. If questions are answered correctly, prizes given away are CDs, DVDs, CD-ROM games, T-shirts, books, caps and other pop culture memorabilia.

References

External links
Flashback Radio Facebook Page
Flashback on Benztown

American music radio programs
Westwood One